Baharon Ki Manzil is a 1973 Pakistani film directed by S. Suleman. Music was composed by the renowned music director Nashad and film song lyrics were written by Taslim Fazli. The film failed at the box-office.

Cast 
 Sangeeta
 Shahid
 Sabiha
 Tariq Aziz
 Talish
 Nanha
 Irfan Khoost
 Zarqa
 Hanif
 Naini
 Chakram
 Tani
 Kemal Irani

Soundtrack 
 	Andaz-e-Karam Jab Aisa Hay.. (Urdu)
Singer(s): Ahmad Rushdi
Music: Nashad, Poet: Taslim Fazli, Actor(s): Shahid
 	Baharon Ki Manzil Bata Denay Waly.. (Urdu)
Singer(s): Noorjahan
Music: Nashad, Poet: Taslim Fazli, Actor(s): Sangeeta
 	Chehray Peh Banawat Ka Ghusa, Ankhon Mein Chhalkata.. (Urdu)
Singer(s): Mala
Music: Nashad, Poet: Taslim Fazli, Actor(s): Sangeeta
 	Chehray Peh Banawat Ka Ghusa, Ankhon Mein Chhalkata.. (Urdu)
Singer(s): Ahmad Rushdi
Music: Nashad, Poet: Taslim Fazli, Actor(s): Shahid
	Door Ham Tujh Say Ho Geye Leikan.. (Urdu)
Singer(s): Noorjahan
Music: Nashad, Poet: Taslim Fazli, Actor(s): Sangeeta
 	Mera Khayal Bhi Hazoor Kar Layn.. (Urdu)
Singer(s): Mala
Music: Nashad, Poet: ?, Actor(s): Sangeeta
 	Sham Hui, Janay Day, Chhor Meri Behna.. (Urdu)
Singer(s): Noorjahan, Rajab Ali
Music: Nashad, Poet: Taslim Fazli, Actor(s): Sangeeta, Shahid
 	Tu Pyar Lay Kay Aya, Main Bahar Ban Geyi.. (Urdu)
Singer(s): Mala, Masood Rana

References

External links 
 

1973 films
1970s Urdu-language films
Pakistani romantic musical films
Urdu-language Pakistani films